The Erlenbach is a 34.2 km long, left tributary of the Michelsbach in the German state of Rhineland-Palatinate.

Course 
The Erlenbach rises in the South Palatine Wasgau region, the southern part of the Palatine Forest, in the municipality of Birkenhördt. It flows eastwards and leaves the Palatine Forest near Bad Bergzabern, where it breaks through the Forest's its eastern perimeter, the Haardt. Next it flows through Kapellen-Drusweiler, Oberhausen, Barbelroth and Winden, before forming the boundary between Kandel and Erlenbach, then Hatzenbühl. After it passes Rheinzabern and Neupotz, it unites in Leimersheim with the Otterbach, coming from the right, to empty into the Michelsbach.

The Michelsbach consists of several former Old Rhine loops and discharges into the Rhine itself at Sondernheim after running parallel to the Rhine for 10 km.

References

Rivers of Rhineland-Palatinate
South Palatinate
Anterior Palatinate
Rivers and lakes of the Palatinate Forest
Rivers of Germany